Thompson Park may refer to:

United Kingdom
Thompson's Park, Cardiff, Wales
Thompson Park (Burnley), Burnley, Lancashire, England

United States
Thompson Park (Lincroft, New Jersey), part of the Monmouth County Park System
Thompson Park (Watertown, New York)
Thompson Park (Charlotte, North Carolina)
Thompson Park (Portland, Oregon)

See also
 Thompson v Park (KB 408), a 1944 English law case concerning licenses in land
 Thomson Park (disambiguation)